Akatsi is a small town and is the capital of Akatsi South District, a district in the Volta Region of Ghana.

Economy
Economic activities in Akatsi are mainly Subsistence agriculture coupled with vibrant buying and selling. Smuggling of clothing from Lomé in Togo through Aflao (the south-eastern border town of Ghana) to Accra. The trans-West Africa highway linking Lomé to Accra through Akatsi also aids an active male dominated transportation business in Akatsi.

Demographics
The inhabitants of Akatsi are Avenor Ewes and the main language of any social and economic interaction is Ewe.
The Ewe settled in the area after the exodus of Ewe tribe from Notsie in Togo to this area in the seventeenth century.

Education
Akatsi is home to the teacher training educational institution Akatsi College of Education, which includes over 700 students and has achieved a good reputation in the area for educating tutors.

References

External links
 AIDS education in Akatsi, Ghana – Site about an educational project in the Akatsi District, including photos and videos

Populated places in the Volta Region